Walter C. "Steel Arm" Davis (June 22, 1896 – November 30, 1941) was an American Negro league baseball player from 1920 to 1938. He played for the Dayton Marcos, Detroit Stars, Chicago American Giants, Nashville Elite Giants, Gilkerson's Union Giants and Brooklyn Eagles.

During the off-season, Davis often returned to his hometown of Madison, Wisconsin, and worked as a porter for many of the local barber shops.

In the later years of his career, Davis worked as a playing manager for the Black Missions baseball team in San Antonio, Texas. The traveling team followed the same traditions of many other barnstorming baseball teams, playing as far away as Canada, Iowa, Minnesota, Kansas and North Dakota. The team also staged exhibitions with Grover Cleveland Alexander when he was with House of David baseball team during summer 1938.

Known to have a hot temper, Davis was shot and killed by "Red" Merrill after a 1941 barroom brawl in Chicago. Merrill was later captured by police.

References

External links
 and Seamheads

1896 births
1941 deaths
Detroit Stars players
Chicago American Giants players
Baseball players from Texas
Dayton Marcos players
People from Freestone County, Texas
Baseball outfielders
Baseball pitchers
Negro league baseball managers
20th-century African-American sportspeople
Deaths by firearm in Illinois